William Yallup, Sr. (born September 1926, Ellensburg, Washington - died June 17, 2006, Toppenish, Washington) was a longtime leader of the Yakama Nation.

A direct descendant of treaty signer Wish-Och-Kmpits, he was born in a tepee at the annual Labor Day Rodeo. He was raised with traditional Yakama teachings and spoke both Yakama and English.  As a young man he joined the Army and spent 12 years in the Marine Corps Reserves.

He began serving in tribal government in 1960 and was elected as a Tribal Councilman in 1972.   During his tenure, he served as the Chief Judge of the Yakama Tribal Court and on nearly every Tribal Council committee, and was well known for his commitment to preserving tribal resources and the Yakamas' traditional rights reserved in their 1855 treaty.  Yallup also sat on regional boards dealing with resource preservation and Northwest tribes and for a time was the state Indian Affairs Commissioner.

References

1926 births
2006 deaths
20th-century Native Americans
21st-century Native Americans
Native American leaders
People from Ellensburg, Washington
Yakama